Sabine River Spanish is a variety of the Spanish language spoken on both sides of the Sabine River between Texas and Louisiana. It has been spoken by a few communities descended from the 18th-century colonists who established Los Adaes and Nacogdoches. Due to its historical origins, it has a mostly conservative phonology with a vocabulary derived from rural Mexican Spanish. It is facing language death as it has not been passed onto children for several generations.

Classification
Sabine River Spanish was formed from rural Mexican Spanish, in spite of the common belief in Nacogdoches that the Spanish-speaking group around the Sabine River is of Isleño origin.
The Sabine River Spanish-speaking communities have no terms to identify themselves as a group. , in reference to Los Adaes, has been used by Armistead and Dr. Comfort Pratt for the dialect spoken on the Louisiana side of the river.  uses "Zwolle-Ebarb Spanish", from the names of two towns in Louisiana where it's spoken. Lipski uses the term Sabine River Spanish because the dialect extends to both sides of the river.

History
The Sabine River Spanish communities were founded as part of a Spanish effort to settle the eastern edge of Texas and adjoining areas of Louisiana in the 1700s. Nacogdoches was founded as part of this settlement and so was Los Adaes.

The Spanish language was preserved in the Sabine River communities until the 20th century due to isolation and, in Texas at least, ethnic solidarity. The Louisiana communities had less ethnic solidarity but greater social isolation due to their distance from population centers, poverty, racial differences from the surrounding population, and the fact they spoke a "foreign" language. The establishment of public schooling exerted strong linguistic pressure on these communities to learn and exclusively speak English, and the arrival of modern infrastructure such as electricity, paved roads, telephones, and the Kansas City Southern Railway through Zwolle reduced their isolation. This stopped the intergenerational transmission of Spanish, with most Spanish-speaking residents choosing not to teach their children the language. In this way the Spanish language has largely died out in a single generation along the Sabine River.

This dialect is currently moribund.
As of the 1980s, there were no more than 50 individuals with significant active competence in Spanish on either side of the river.
 estimated the presence of just ten people who still speak Spanish fluently in the Zwolle-Ebarb area, who were mainly in their seventies and eighties.

Geographic distribution
The Sabine River area's Spanish dialect is found on either side of the Toledo Bend Reservoir along the Sabine River. Most of the Spanish speakers in the Louisiana side were found around Zwolle, Ebarb and Noble, and in the Spanish Lake community near Robeline. In Texas they are concentrated in the Moral community west of Nacogdoches.

The Louisiana and Texas communities differ in terms of ethnic identification. Louisiana residents have diverse appearances, some being very pale and others vary dark-complexioned, and have experienced a re-surfacing of American Indian identity. As a result, they may identify ethnically as either Spanish, Indo-Spanish, or simply American Indian. The Louisiana residents have been called "Meskin", "Chonche", and "Red Bones" by their Anglo-American neighbors. Louisiana residents reject any identification as "Mexican", while Moral residents freely use the term  and even occasionally call their dialect . In Moral there is no identification with Native American culture, despite the open acknowledgement of many , or 'dark-complexioned' residents.

Dialects 
Different studies and surveys have focused on different Spanish-speaking communities in the area.  focuses on the variety spoken in Zwolle and Ebarb; four of her five informants have lived most of their lives in Ebarb, with one later moving to Zwolle, while one lived most of his life near Zwolle. Pratt focused on all the Louisiana dialects, calling them .

In terms of differences between the different varieties,  finds that the Adaeseño varieties in Louisiana are generally homogenous.  says that the Moral dialect "may reflect some aspects of Mexican Spanish from the first decades of the nineteenth centuries" while the Louisiana dialects are derived from eighteenth-century Mexican Spanish. This would be because Nacogdoches experienced a period of growth between 1821 and 1836. The current Moral dialect has more speakers and is also more heavily influenced by modern Mexican Spanish, due to a higher frequency of contact with Mexican Spanish speakers. 

 mentions a greater number of French loanwords in the speech of the communities closer to Natchitoches.

Phonology 

Sabine River Spanish, being derived from northern Mexican Spanish, is rather phonologically conservative, generally retaining consonants and avoiding neutralizations. English influence is noted as well, and there are various phonological misidentifications, analogical forms and sporadic variations. Sabine River Spanish is, like most Spanish dialects, yeísta, and like other Spanish dialects in the Americas, seseante.

Fricatives 
 is occasionally aspirated or elided, with elision being more common than aspiration, though it is conserved most often.  may even be aspirated or elided when between vowels.  may also become voiced, like , between vowels or at the end of a phrase.

The phoneme  becomes a weak  before , so  'outside' is pronounced . Otherwise,  is a voiceless labiodental fricative .  is typically pronounced  as well. This allophone doesn't appear elsewhere in her survey.

Nasals 
This variety does not velarize final , though  may occasionally be elided between vowels or at the end of a phrase. When it's elided, the preceding vowel is nasalized.

A similar pronunciation is found in Brazilian and Angolan Portuguese.

 shows no irregularity.

Voiceless stops 
 is occasionally alveolar, unlike the typical voiceless denti-alveolar plosive of Spanish, and may even be flapped. That is a result of contact with English. Unstressed vowels are often reduced to a schwa.

Liquids 
The lateral consonant  is occasionally elided before other consonants. Word-final  occasionally becomes  before a word starting in a vowel.

Lipski reports that the opposition between the alveolar trill  and the alveolar tap  has been largely neutralized and that the extension of this neutralization points to an earlier origin. On the other hand, this neutralization isn't found in 's notes. In , the neutralization isn't found in the speech of the oldest, most fluent informant.  also finds that the trilled  may occasionally be elided.

Voiced obstruents 
The voiced obstruents  show some deviation from standard pronunciation.  may be pronounced as a fricative even at the beginning of a phrase or after a nasal.

 is rarely realized as a voiced dental stop , even after a pause or a nasal. In general, it's realized as a voiced dental fricative . Intervocalically, in an unstressed syllable, it may be elided, as in many other Spanish varieties, ie:  .  is frequently elided at the beginning of words, and  'where' is typically pronounced . It may also be realized as an alveolar tap  between vowels, though this is only found among the last generation of Spanish speakers.

 is realized as a voiced velar stop after a pause and in any consonant cluster, for example in   'Gregorio',   'cotton',   'black haw tree'.

Vowels 
The vowel system in Zwolle-Ebarb contains the same 5 vowels as other Spanish varieties. Vowels are nasalized when they're between nasal consonants or before . Unstressed vowels, especially , are often reduced to a schwa.  often becomes , especially at the ends of words, and including in the conjunction  'or'. Hiatus between vowels tends to be avoided, either by the formation of diphthongs or by the deletion of some of the vowels involved.

 found that  becomes nasalized before , such as in the  ending where the  has been elided.

Clusters 

Grammar
The grammar of Sabine River Spanish reflects its origins in nonstandard, rural Mexican speech, as well as influence from English and morphological reduction due to language death.

Dr. Comfort Pratt has found that , despite its mostly Mexican providence, uses vosotros as a second-person plural pronoun, with the corresponding verb forms, as in  'you (pl.) have'. Thus,  'you and your sister have'. Voseo is nonexistent in Sabine River Spanish.

 expressions are widespread, as in other Spanish varieties in contact with English. As a result of language death and its speakers' greater fluency in English, gender and number agreement are greatly weakened. In addition, use of the subjunctive mood, the simple, or synthetic future tense, and the conditional tense is greatly reduced. The remaining speakers of  generally prefer analytic constructions.

Vocabulary
Many Mexicanisms, including a large number of Nahuatl loanwords, and generally archaic or rustic words are used in Sabine River Spanish. The majority of Nahuatl loans have to do with plants, animals, or elements of material culture. Almost all Nahuatl loans are nouns. Sabine River Spanish has taken in very few English loanwords. French loans are common in the communities closer to Natchitoches, and they are more common than English words.

Despite an extensive history of contact, Sabine River Spanish almost no loans from native American languages besides Nahuatl. This likely reflects frontier conditions in which native Americans were marginalized.

The term , a local slur for Spanish people, likely comes from the Wichita term for the Lipan Apache, many of whom were sold as slaves to the Spanish and French and were the ancestors of many Sabine River Hispanics, though it may have a Muskogean origin in a term for swallows.

The term , which refers to driving or spurring on animals, became the Zwolle-Ebarb community's term for driving a car. The same word is used for driving in Traditional New Mexican Spanish. The word , used to refer to geese, is also found in both Zwolle-Ebarb and Traditional New Mexican Spanish.

Some of the Nahuatlisms in Sabine River Spanish include:

Other Mexicanisms include:

Generally archaic words in Sabine River Spanish, no longer used in standard speech elsewhere, include:

Other items include:

Code switching 
Vestigial speakers of Sabine River Spanish, often with limited active competence in the language, would often engage in code-switching while attempting to speak entirely in Spanish. The rate of switching between languages in a single sentence was very high, and often violated the typical syntactic restrictions on Spanish/English code-switching. Code-switching could occur between subject pronouns and predicates, as in "they " ("they would boil the pots"), and between negative words and the main verb, as in " agreed" ("if the father and the mother didn't agree"), or between fronted interrogative words and the rest of the sentence, as in "Nobody knows which way " ("nobody knows which way they went"), to give some examples of code-switches that violate the normal syntactic restraints.

See also
 Isleño Spanish
 Los Adaes
 New Mexican Spanish
 Choctaw-Apache Tribe of Ebarb
 Louisiana (New Spain)

References

Bibliography

 
 
 
 
 
 
 
 
 
 

Endangered Romance languages
Louisiana (New Spain)
Spanish-American culture in Louisiana
Spanish language in North America
Spanish language in the United States
Minority languages
Endangered diaspora languages
Endangered languages of the United States